Sam ibn Wardanruz was the first ruler of the Atabegs of Yazd dynasty from 1141 to 1188. 

Sam was appointed as atabeg by Ahmad Sanjar in 1141, where he married one of the daughters of the Kakuyid Garshasp II. He is described as a weak ruler, and was in 1188 replaced by his more capable brother Langar ibn Wardanruz. Sam later died in 1193.

Sources

1193 deaths
Year of birth unknown
12th-century Iranian people